Hamza Heriat (born 6 September 1987 in Biskra) is an Algerian professional footballer.

Club career
Heriat began his career with US Biskra. In the summer of 2010, Heriat received offers from a number of clubs including USM Alger, ES Sétif, USM El Harrach and USM Blida On 17 June 2010 he chose to join USM Alger signing a two-year contract with the club., now he play with MC Oran.

References

External links
 DZFoot Profile
 
 USM-Alger.com Profile

1987 births
Living people
Algerian footballers
USM Alger players
US Biskra players
MC Oran players
USM Blida players
Algerian Ligue Professionnelle 1 players
Association football midfielders
21st-century Algerian people